Protection of the varieties of Chinese refers to efforts to protect the continued existence of the varieties of Chinese (including Yue Chinese, Wu Chinese, Gan Chinese, Min Chinese, Xiang Chinese, Hakka Chinese, varieties of Mandarin, and others) in Mainland China and other places against pressure to abandon these languages and use Standard Chinese. The Ministry of Education of the People's Republic of China has proclaimed to be taking active measures to protect ten varieties of Chinese. However, a large majority of the citizens of China speak a dialect of Mandarin Chinese, a standardized form of which has been enforced and promoted by the communist government of China for the last sixty years. The Constitution of the People's Republic of China calls on the government to promote Putonghua as the common tongue of the nation, but this policy has caused conflict to a certain extent with plans to preserve local varieties of Chinese. Education and media programming in varieties of Chinese other than Mandarin have been discouraged by the governments of the People's Republic of China, Singapore, and Taiwan. Teaching the varieties of Chinese to non-native speakers is discouraged by the laws of the People's Republic of China in favor of Putonghua. The Guangdong National Language Regulations are a set of laws enacted by the Guangdong provincial government in the People's Republic of China in 2012 to promote the use of Standard Mandarin Chinese in broadcast and print media at the expense of the local standard Cantonese and other related dialects. It has also been labelled a "pro-Mandarin, anti-Yue" legislation ( or ).

For forty years following the arrival of the Kuomintang government in Taiwan, the Taiwanese, Hakka and Taiwan aboriginal languages were suppressed by the government in favor of Mandarin Chinese, until the mid-1990s.

Examples

Min Nan
In June 2007, China created a zone for the protection of Min Nan culture, the first of its kind in mainland China. In March 2010, eighteen elementary schools and ten kindergartens in Amoy (Xiamen) became Min Nan study centers, complete with Min Nan educational materials, including training in pronunciation, colloquialisms and history. On March 5, 2011, the Xiamen Experimental Elementary School implemented the "Min Nan Day" activity, encouraging students to study Min Nan culture.

In Taiwan 
The native language of many inhabitants of the Matsu Islands (Lienchiang County), ROC (Taiwan) is the Matsu dialect, which is one of the statutory languages for public transport announcements in the county. It has been compulsory in primary schools in the area since 2017.

In an amendment to Article 14 of the Enforcement Rules of the Passport Act passed on August 9, 2019, the Ministry of Foreign Affairs (Taiwan) announced that Taiwanese can use the romanized spellings of their names in Hoklo, Hakka and Aboriginal languages for their passports. Previously, only Mandarin Chinese names could be romanized. Since 2017, Taiwanese language classes have been compulsory in all primary schools except those in predominantly Hakka or Aboriginal areas and the Matsu islands.

See also
 Holopedia
 Speak Hokkien Campaign
 Taiwanese literature movement
 Guangzhou Television Cantonese controversy
 Universal Declaration of Linguistic Rights

References

Language revival
Varieties of Chinese